The Troy Haymakers were an American professional baseball team.

History
Established in 1860 as the Union Base Ball Club Lansingburgh, located in neighboring Lansingburgh, New York, the Haymakers participated in the first professional pennant race of 1869 and joined the first professional league, the 1871 National Association of Professional Base Ball Players (NAPBBP). They disbanded halfway through the 1872 season "on account of an empty treasury."

By 1868 the "Troy Haymakers" nickname for Union of Lansingburgh was common, although the team was sometimes called the Trojans. On the field it was one of the strongest teams in the nominally amateur National Association of Base Ball Players. Some players were from New York City; presumably the club compensated them.

When the Association permitted openly professional teams for the 1869 season, the Haymakers were one of twelve to go pro. Evidently they were fifth in playing strength for they finished with a 12–8–1 record including two wins, eight defeats, and one tie (2–8–1) against the four strongest teams and ten wins in ten matches with the others. By playing strength they ranked about the same among fifteen professional teams in 1870, at 11–13–1. During the former season, a forfeit win over the Haymakers on August 26 in Cincinnati was the only blemish on the record of the first professional team, the undefeated 1869 Red Stockings. (The Haymakers withdrew from the field with the score 17–17 in the sixth inning.)

Along with two newcomers, seven of the professional teams from 1870 established a new all-professional National Association early in 1871, known today as the first professional sports league. The rival amateur Association declined rapidly and soon left the government of baseball to the sole leadership of the professionals, but the early pros from Troy/Lansingburgh did not survive to take part.

During the two NAPBBP season, home games were played at Haymakers' Grounds in Troy, New York. The Haymakers were managed by Lip Pike, Bill Craver, and Jimmy Wood; they won 28 games and lost 25 for a winning percentage of .528. Their 15–10 record in 1872 was one of the best for any major team to go out of business.

In baseball history today, the 1879–1882 National League club in Troy is sometimes called the Haymakers.

There is now a team in the Albany Twilight League known as the Troy Haymakers.

See also
1871 Troy Haymakers season
1872 Troy Haymakers season

References

External links
Baseball Reference Team Index

Further reading
Wright, Marshall (2000). The National Association of Base Ball Players, 1857-1870. Jefferson, NC: McFarland & Co. 

 
National Association of Base Ball Players teams
Defunct National Association baseball teams
Troy, New York
Baseball teams established in 1860
Baseball teams disestablished in 1872
1860 establishments in New York (state)
1872 disestablishments in New York (state)
Defunct baseball teams in New York (state)
League Alliance teams
Sports in Rensselaer County, New York